The Mendoza C-1934 was a light machine gun similar to the M1918 BAR manufactured in Mexico. It was chambered in 7 mm calibre and had a 20-round magazine fed from the top.

Rafael Mendoza produced machine guns for the Mexican Army beginning in 1933 and all have been noted for their lightness and cheap construction without sacrificing reliability. They use a gas cylinder system that delivers a short impulse to the piston, and the bolt is similar to that of the Lewis Gun, rotating and driven by two cams engaged with the piston rod. The C-1934 model adds a simplified method of stripping, by simply removing a lock pin, the stock and rear of the receiver can be folded down to allow the bolt and piston to be withdrawn backwards.

See also
Furrer M25
Bren gun
Mendoza HM-3
Mendoza RM2
Mondragón rifle

References

Mendoza C-1934 light machinegun

Light machine guns
Firearms of Mexico